Suraya Dalil (Uzbek/), (born 1970) is an Afghan physician and politician who served as Minister of Public Health from 2010 to 2014 and has been the country's Permanent Representative to the United Nations since November 2015.

Early life and education
Dalil was born in Kabul in February 1970. Her father was a teacher and encouraged her education despite it being unusual at the time. She attended the Zarghona High School and graduated from Kabul Medical University in 1991. Her family then moved to Mazar-i-Sharif after her father was injured during the civil war.

In 2004, Dalil was awarded a Presidential Scholarship to attend the Harvard School of Public Health and graduated with a master's degree in public health in 2005.

Career
Dalil worked with Médecins Sans Frontières providing health care to Tajik refugees in northern Afghanistan in 1992 and 1993. She then worked with the International Organization for Migration providing medical assistance to Afghan refugees returning from Pakistan and Iran.

Dalil began working with UNICEF in Afghanistan in 1994, overseeing a large scale measles and polio immunization project. When the Taliban reached Mazar-i-Sharif in 1998, she fled on foot with her family to Pakistan, where she resumed working for the UNICEF Afghanistan office which had been relocated there. After the fall of the Taliban, she returned to Kabul in 2002 with her family. She worked there until 2007, when UNICEF appointed her Chief of Health and Nutrition Program in Somalia, where she worked until December 2009.

In January 2010, Dalil was assigned as Acting Minister of Public Health by President Hamid Karzai, and she was appointed Minister in March 2012. She initiated various strategies to reduce child and maternal mortality rates.

In November 2015, President Ashraf Ghani appointed Dalil as Permanent Representative of the Government of the Islamic Republic of Afghanistan to the United Nations in Geneva, the first woman in the position.

At the end of 2017, Dalil was named President of the Anti-Personnel Mine Ban Convention (Ottawa Treaty), which bans the use, production, transfer and stockpiling of anti-personnel mines. Afghanistan is one of the countries most affected by these weapons. Her presidency of the Convention ends at the end of 2018.

Other activities
 International Gender Champions (IGC), Member

Awards and honours
In 2012, Dalil was awarded a prize by the Vaccination World Union for her achievements in implementing country-wide vaccination. In 2014, she accepted a Resolve Award Special Mention from the Global Leaders Council for Reproductive Health recognising Afghanistan's efforts to prioritise reproductive, maternal and child health.

Selected publications

Personal life
Dalil's native language is Uzbeki, and she also speaks Dari, Pashto, and English. Her husband is also a medical doctor, and they have three children.

References

External links
 Embassy biography
 

Living people
1970 births
People from Kabul
Kabul University alumni
Harvard School of Public Health alumni
Afghan public health doctors
UNICEF people
Health ministers of Afghanistan
Public health ministers
Women government ministers of Afghanistan
Permanent Representatives of Afghanistan to the United Nations
Afghan women ambassadors
Afghan Uzbek politicians
Afghan officials of the United Nations
Women public health doctors